Elsa Recillas Pishmish (also published as Elsa Recillas-Cruz) is a Mexican astronomer whose research involves photometry of galaxies and their brightest stars, and of emission nebulae. She is a professor and researcher in the Mexican National Institute of Astrophysics, Optics and Electronics.

Education
Recillas studied physics at the National Autonomous University of Mexico (UNAM), graduating in 1968, and went on to earn a master's degree in astronomy from the University of Sussex in England in 1971. She returned to UNAM for a second master's degree in physics in 1983 and a doctorate in 1988.

Book
With her daughter Irene Cruz-González, Recillas is a coauthor of a book on Galileo, El hombre de la torre inclinada: Galileo Galilei (1st ed., Gatopardo, 1985).

Personal life
Recillas comes from an astronomical and mathematical family. Her mother Paris Pişmiş was a noted Armenian-Mexican astronomer, and her father Félix Recillas Juárez was a mathematician. Her brother Sevín Recillas Pishmish also became a mathematician. Recillas married astronomer Carlos Cruz-González, and their daughter Irene Cruz-González also became an astronomer.

Recognition
Recillas is a member of the Mexican Academy of Sciences.

References

Year of birth missing (living people)
Living people
Mexican astronomers
Women astronomers
National Autonomous University of Mexico alumni
Alumni of the University of Sussex
Members of the Mexican Academy of Sciences